Juan Carlos Molina Merlos (born 18 July 1974 in Granada) is a cyclist and skier from Spain. He has a disability: He is blind and is a B3 type skier and cyclist.

He competed at the 1996 Summer Paralympics in cycling in the Tandem one bicycle track Pursuit race.

He competed at the 1994 Winter Paralympics in alpine skiing. He finished first in the downhill race. He finished 8 in the Super Giant race. He competed at the 1998 Winter Paralympics.  He finished first in the downhill race.

References

External links 
 
 

1974 births
Living people
Spanish male cyclists
Spanish male alpine skiers
Paralympic gold medalists for Spain
Paralympic bronze medalists for Spain
Paralympic alpine skiers of Spain
Paralympic cyclists of Spain
Paralympic medalists in alpine skiing
Paralympic medalists in cycling
Alpine skiers at the 1994 Winter Paralympics
Alpine skiers at the 1998 Winter Paralympics
Cyclists at the 1992 Summer Paralympics
Cyclists at the 1996 Summer Paralympics
Medalists at the 1992 Summer Paralympics
Medalists at the 1994 Winter Paralympics
Medalists at the 1998 Winter Paralympics
Sportspeople from Granada
Cyclists from Andalusia
20th-century Spanish people